Aleksandr Vladimirovich Khokhlachyov (born 8 May 1997) is a Russian football player who plays for FC Chayka Peschanokopskoye.

Club career
He made his debut in the Russian Professional Football League for FC Chayka Peschanokopskoye on 28 July 2016 in a game against FC Biolog-Novokubansk. He made his Russian Football National League debut for Chayka on 7 July 2019 in a game against FC Chertanovo Moscow.

References

External links
 Profile by Russian Professional Football League

1997 births
Sportspeople from Rostov-on-Don
Living people
Russian footballers
Association football forwards
Russian First League players
Russian Second League players
FC Chayka Peschanokopskoye players